Psocinae is a subfamily of common barklice in the family Psocidae. There are about 11 genera and at least 40 described species in Psocinae.

Genera
These 11 genera belong to the subfamily Psocinae:
 Atropsocus Mockford, 1993 i c g b
 Camelopsocus Mockford, 1965 i c g b
 Cerastipsocus Kolbe, 1884 i c g b
 Hyalopsocus Roesler, 1954 i c g b
 Indiopsocus Mockford, 1974 i c g b
 Loensia Enderlein, 1924 i c g b
 Metylophorus Pearman, 1932 i c g b
 Psocus Latreille, 1794 i c g b
 Ptycta Enderlein, 1925 i c g b
 Steleops Enderlein, 1910 i c g b
 Trichadenotecnum Enderlein, 1909 i c g b
Data sources: i = ITIS, c = Catalogue of Life, g = GBIF, b = Bugguide.net

References

Further reading

External links

 

Psocidae